Coleophora therinella is a moth of the family Coleophoridae found in Asia and Europe.

Description
The wingspan is 13–16 mm. Coleophora species have narrow blunt to pointed forewings and a weakly defined tornus. The hindwings are narrow-elongate and very long-fringed. The upper surfaces have neither a discal spot nor transverse lines. Each abdomen segment of the abdomen has paired patches of tiny spines which show through the scales. The resting position is horizontal with the front end raised and the cilia give the hind tip a frayed and upturned look if the wings are rolled around the body. C. therinella characteristics include head whitish-ochreous, sides whitish. Antennae white, tinged with fuscous, basal joint loosely haired. Forewings narrower than in C. troglodytella, brownish-ochreous; white streaks as in C. troglodytella, but more indistinct. Hindwings grey. Only reliably identified by dissection and microscopic examination of the genitalia. Adults are on wing from June to August.

The larvae feed on Carlina, Carduus and Cirsium species. The larvae feed on the seeds of their host plant, living in a portable case.

Distribution
The moth is found in most of Europe, Russia, central Asia and Japan, occurring in steppe biotopes and in anthropogenic areas.

References

External links
 Bestimmungshilfe für die in Europa nachgewiesenen Schmetterlingsarten
 Coleophora therinella at UKmoths

therinella
Moths described in 1848
Moths of Asia
Moths of Europe